1999 L.League Cup Final was the fourth final of the L. League Cup competition. The final was played at Nihondaira Sports Stadium in Shizuoka on June 13, 1999. NTV Beleza won the championship.

Overview
NTV Beleza won their second title, by defeating defending champion Prima Ham FC Kunoichi, 1–0.

Match details

See also
1999 L.League Cup

References

Nadeshiko League Cup
1999 in Japanese women's football